Brunello is a comune (municipality) in the Province of Varese in the Italian region Lombardy, located about  northwest of Milan and about  southwest of Varese.

The municipality of Brunello contains the frazioni (subdivisions, mainly villages and hamlets) Collodri and Rosea.

Brunello borders the following municipalities: Azzate, Buguggiate, Castronno, Gazzada Schianno, Morazzone, Sumirago.

Demographic evolution

References

External links
 www.ilcircolino.it/comune.brunello/

Cities and towns in Lombardy